Talegaon railway station or Talegaon station is an important railway station on the Mumbai–Pune railway route. It has two platforms, five lines and one footbridge. This is a major halt for Pune Suburban Railway trains. This station serves as terminal for Pune–Talegaon suburban trains.

The land for the construction of the Talegaon railway station was given to the British government by the Sardar Dabhade family. Now it is owned by Indian Railways.

Talegaon MIDC, an industrial area, is situated nearby this station.

Suburban

 –Lonavala Locals.
 Pune Junction– station Locals.
 –Lonavala Local.
 Shivajinagar–Talegaon station Local.

Express/Mails

 Mumbai–Pune Deccan Express.
 Mumbai–Kolhapur Sahyadri Express.
 Mumbai–Kolhapur Koyna Express.
 Hazur Sahib Nanded-Panvel Express

Passengers

 –Karjat Passenger
 Mumbai–Pandharpur Passenger
 Mumbai–Bijapur Passenger
 Mumbai–Shirdi Passenger

See also
 Talegaon Dabhade
 Pune Suburban Railway

References

Talegaon Dabhade

Pune Suburban Railway
Pune railway division
Railway stations in Pune district
Year of establishment missing